Kermia bifasciata is a species of sea snail, a marine gastropod mollusk in the family Raphitomidae.

It was assigned to Kermia by Kay, 1979

Description
The length of the shell varies between 5.32 mm and 8.04 mm.

(Original description) The fusiform, shining shell is longitudinally coarsely ribbed (14 on the body whorl) and crossed by coarse raised striae. The protoconch consists of three brown conical whorls. The five whorls of the teleoconch are rounded at the sutures. The outer lip is thick, incurved, serrated on the edges at the termination of the transverse striae. The ovate aperture has no denticles. The siphonal canal is short and slightly recurved. The colour of the shell is white. There are two light  brown bands on each whorl.

Distribution
This marine species occurs off Hawaii and Easter Island and French Polynesia; also in the Red Sea.

References

 Liu J.Y. [Ruiyu] (ed.). (2008). Checklist of marine biota of China seas. China Science Press. 1267 pp.

External links
 MNHN, Paris: specimen
 Moretzsohn, Fabio, and E. Alison Kay. "HAWAIIAN MARINE MOLLUSCS." (1995)
 Li B.-Q. [Baoquan & Li X.-Z. [Xinzheng] (2014) Report on the Raphitomidae Bellardi, 1875 (Mollusca: Gastropoda: Conoidea) from the China Seas. Journal of Natural History 48(17-18): 999-1025]
 
 Gastropods.com: Kermia bifasciata
 Tröndlé, J. E. A. N., and Michel Boutet. "Inventory of marine molluscs of French Polynesia." Atoll Research Bulletin (2009)
 Dekker, Henk, and Zvi Orlin. "Check-list of Red Sea mollusca." Spirula 1 (2000): 3-46.

bifasciata
Gastropods described in 1860